Westringia sericea, also known as native rosemary or silky rosemary, is a species of plant in the mint family that is endemic to Australia.

Description
The species grows as a shrub to 0.3–2 m in height. The lanceolate to linear leaves are about 20–30 mm long and 1.5–4 mm wide, appearing in whorls of three. The flowers appear in spring; they are pale mauve in colour with small orange to brownish dots.

Distribution and habitat
The species is found in south-eastern Queensland and north-eastern New South Wales. It grows on rocky slopes and ridges in sclerophyll forest.

References

sericea
Lamiales of Australia
Flora of New South Wales
Flora of Queensland
Plants described in 1949